The Bellingshausen Plate was an ancient tectonic plate that fused onto the Antarctic Plate. It is named after Fabian Gottlieb von Bellingshausen, the Russian discoverer of Antarctica.

The plate was in existence during the Late Cretaceous epoch and Paleogene period adjacent to eastern Marie Byrd Land. Independent plate motion ceased at 61 mya. The boundaries are poorly defined.

References
Eagles, G., K. Gohl and R. D. Larter (2004) Life of the Bellingshausen plate, Geophysical Research Letters, 31, L07603 Abstract
McCarron, Joe J. and Robert D. Larter, Late Cretaceous to early Tertiary subduction history of the Antarctic Peninsula, Journal of the Geological Society,  March 1998  

Historical tectonic plates
Cretaceous geology
Paleocene geology
Natural history of Antarctica